Stanislau Daineka (born 8 July 1998) is a Belarusian sprint canoeist.

He won a medal at the 2019 ICF Canoe Sprint World Championships.

References

1998 births
Living people
Belarusian male canoeists
ICF Canoe Sprint World Championships medalists in kayak
Canoeists at the 2014 Summer Youth Olympics
Youth Olympic gold medalists for Belarus
Canoeists at the 2019 European Games
European Games competitors for Belarus